Vincent Edward "Bo" Jackson (born November 30, 1962) is an American former professional baseball and football player. He is the only professional athlete in history to be named an All-Star in both baseball and football. Jackson's elite achievements in multiple sports have given him the reputation as one of the greatest athletes of all time.

Jackson played college football as a running back for the Auburn Tigers, and won the Heisman Trophy in 1985. He played in the National Football League (NFL) for the Los Angeles Raiders and in Major League Baseball (MLB) for the Kansas City Royals, Chicago White Sox, and California Angels. He was inducted into the College Football Hall of Fame in 1996.

In 1989 and 1990, Jackson's name became known beyond just sports through the "Bo Knows" advertising campaign, a series of advertisements by Nike, starring Jackson alongside musician Bo Diddley, promoting a cross-training athletic shoe named for Jackson.

A 1991 hip injury on the field ended his football career, and his baseball career ended in 1994. Jackson expanded into other pursuits, including the completion of his Bachelor of Science degree in Family and Child Development at Auburn. Jackson still holds the record for most runs for 90+ yards from scrimmage with two. In addition, Jackson appeared in small roles as an actor in television shows such as The Fresh Prince of Bel-Air and Married... with Children, as well as films such as The Chamber.

Early life 
Jackson, the eighth of ten children, was born on November 30, 1962, and raised in Bessemer, Alabama. He was named after Vince Edwards, his mother's favorite actor. His family described him as a "wild boar hog," as he would constantly get into trouble.

He attended school in McCalla, where he rushed for 1,175 yards as a running back as a high school senior. Jackson hit 20 home runs in 25 games for McCalla's baseball team during his senior season. He was a two-time state champion in the decathlon. Both times that he was the decathlon state champion, he built up such a commanding points lead before the 1500 meters that he never competed in that event. "Distance is the only thing I hate about track," he said. In 1982, Jackson set state school records for indoor high jump and triple jump.

College (1982–1986)
In June 1982, Jackson was selected by the New York Yankees in the second round of the 1982 Major League Baseball draft, but he instead chose to attend Auburn University on a football scholarship because he promised his mother he would be the first in the family to go to a major college. He was recruited by head coach Pat Dye and then Auburn assistant coach Bobby Wallace alongside defensive head coach Dominic Sauer. At Auburn, he proved to be a tremendous athlete in both baseball and football. He shared the backfield with quarterback Randy Campbell, Lionel "Little Train" James and Tommie Agee.

Collegiate football
During his time playing for the Auburn Tigers football team, he ran for 4,303 career yards, which was the fourth best performance in Southeastern Conference (SEC) history. Jackson finished his career with an average of 6.6 yards per carry, which set the SEC record (minimum 400 rushes).

In 1982, Jackson's freshman year, Auburn played Boston College in the Tangerine Bowl, where Jackson made a one-handed grab on an option pitch. Auburn went on to win the game 33–26 as Jackson rushed 14 times for 64 yards and 2 touchdowns.

In 1983, as a sophomore, Jackson rushed for 1,213 yards on 158 carries, for an average of 7.7 yards per carry, which was the second-best single-season average in SEC history (minimum 100 rushes). In the 1983 Auburn-Alabama game, Jackson rushed for 256 yards on 20 rushes (12.8 yards per carry), which at the time was the sixth-most rushing yards gained in a game in SEC history and the 2nd best yard-per-rush average in a game (minimum 20 attempts) in SEC history. Auburn finished the season by winning the Sugar Bowl against Michigan, where Jackson was named Most Valuable Player. In 1984, Jackson's junior year (most of which Jackson missed due to injury), he earned Most Valuable Player honors at the Liberty Bowl after defeating Arkansas.

In 1985, Jackson rushed for 1,786 yards which was the second-best single-season performance in SEC history. For his performance in 1985, Jackson was awarded the Heisman Trophy in what was considered the closest margin of victory ever in the history of the award, winning over University of Iowa quarterback Chuck Long. In 1986, he received the Golden Plate Award of the American Academy of Achievement presented by Awards Council member and Heisman Trophy winner Herschel Walker.

Jackson finished his career at Auburn with 4,575 all-purpose yards and 45 total touchdowns, 43 rushing and 2 receiving, with a 6.6 yards per carry average. Jackson's football number 34 was officially retired at Auburn in a halftime ceremony on October 31, 1992. His is one of only three numbers retired at Auburn. The others are 1971 Heisman Trophy winner Pat Sullivan's number 7, and the number 88 of Sullivan's teammate and favorite receiver, Terry Beasley. In 2007, Jackson was ranked #8 on ESPN's Top 25 Players In College Football History list.

Statistics

Collegiate baseball
Jackson missed much of his senior season after being ruled ineligible by the NCAA following a visit with the Tampa Bay Buccaneers, which he believes tried to sabotage his baseball career.

In an April 1985 report, a major league scout stated that Jackson's only weakness was a lack of baseball experience. The scout said that he could be one of the all-time greats barring any injuries. He had a minor shoulder injury in the beginning of his collegiate football career, which didn't cause him issues in the long term. The scout also noted that this was his first year playing baseball and he seemed to be a "do it all type of player" and also stated he was "the best pure athlete in America today". At the time, Jackson was 22 years old, and trying to make an even bigger name for himself than he already had in his football career. In this scouting report, Jackson's worth to an MLB team was listed at only $200,000, much less than what he would end up taking home later on in his short-lived careers.

Statistics

"Bo Over the Top"

On November 27, 1982, Jackson and the Auburn Tigers found themselves embattled with their heated in-state rival, Alabama (7–3), in the Iron Bowl in Birmingham, Alabama. Auburn held a 14–13 halftime lead when Alabama running back Paul Ott Carruth scored on an eight-yard touchdown run—and then the Crimson Tide added a field goal to make it a 22–14 Alabama lead going into the 4th quarter. Auburn responded as Al Del Greco made a 23-yard field goal to make it a 22–17 score in the 4th quarter. From Auburn's own 34-yard line, Bo Jackson and company began a long drive as he converted on a 4th-and-1 at the Alabama 42. Jackson, who ran 17 times for 114 yards during this Iron Bowl, continued marching his team downfield as he caught an 8-yard pass from quarterback Randy Campbell down to the Alabama 1-yard line. During the huddle, Bo convinced Coach Dye to let him go over the top of offensive and defensive lines because he was a seven-foot high jumper in high school and the other team wouldn't be expecting it. On fourth down with 2:26 left in the game, Jackson completed the drive by going over the top for a one-yard touchdown run as Auburn (which finished 9–3 in 1982) pulled off a 23–22 victory over Alabama and coach Paul "Bear" Bryant.

College track and field
While at McAdory High School, Jackson competed as a sprinter, hurdler, jumper, thrower and decathlete. His best 100-meter time in high school was 10.44 seconds, but he would later run a 10.39 at Auburn. He also ran the 100-yard dash in 9.54 seconds. As a hurdler, he recorded times of 7.29 seconds in the 55m hurdles and 13.81 seconds in the 110m hurdles. In decathlon, he reached 8340 points.

Jackson qualified for the NCAA nationals in the 100-meter dash in his freshman and sophomore years. He considered a career in track and field, but sprinting would not gain him the financial security of MLB or the NFL, nor would he have sufficient time to train, given his other commitments. When asked if he ran a 4.12 40-yard dash at the 1986 NFL Scouting Combine, the fastest time ever recorded in NFL Combine history and a time that has been rumored from several sources, Jackson claimed some of the coaches hand-timed him at 3.9 and 4.0, but that he actually ran a 4.13 electronic-timed 40-yard dash at a pro day at Auburn University. He also stated he did not attend the 1986 Scouting Combine: "I did not go because I was already picked to be the first person to go in the draft," Jackson said. "If you're going to be the first person to go in the draft, why should you go to a combine and do all of that?"

Personal bests

Professional sports career

Baseball

Kansas City Royals
Jackson was selected with the first overall pick of the 1986 NFL Draft by the Tampa Bay Buccaneers, but he refused to play for them because a visit to team facilities the Buccaneers said was NCAA-approved was actually not, causing him to miss the remainder of his final college baseball season. Jackson believes that the failure to obtain NCAA approval was deliberate and was intended by the Buccaneers to get him to play football instead of baseball. He vowed not to sign with Tampa Bay should they draft him, but they proceeded anyway. He kept his vow and opted to play baseball for the Kansas City Royals, the defending World Series champions, which drafted him in the fourth round, 105th overall, in the 1986 amateur draft. Shortly after the draft, Jackson signed a three-year contract with the Kansas City Royals worth just over $1 million. He spent 53 games with the Memphis Chicks, the Royals' Class AA minor league affiliate, and was called up to the majors in September 1986. He made the Royals' roster in 1987 as a left fielder, and hit 22 home runs, with 53 RBIs and 10 stolen bases.

Jackson began to show his true potential in 1989, when he was voted to start for the American League All-Star team, and was named the game's MVP for his play on both offense and defense. In the top of the first inning, he caught Pedro Guerrero's two-out line drive to left-center field to save two runs. Then he led off the bottom of the first—his first All-Star plate appearance—with a monstrous  home run against Rick Reuschel of the San Francisco Giants. NBC-TV announcer Vin Scully exclaimed, "Look at that one! Bo Jackson says hello!" Wade Boggs followed with his own home run, making them the first pair in All-Star history to lead off the first inning with back-to-back home runs. In the second inning, he beat the throw on a potential double play to drive in the eventual winning run. He then stole second base, making him the second player in All-Star Game history to hit a home run and steal a base in the same game (the first was Willie Mays). Jackson finished the game with two hits in four at-bats, one run scored, and two RBI.

On July 29, 1988, against the Baltimore Orioles, Jackson, batting against Jeff Ballard, attempted to call time out as Ballard was delivering the ball. The time-out wasn't granted, but Jackson recovered to swing and hit the pitch over the left-field wall for a home run despite taking one hand off the bat at the beginning of the at bat.

Jackson's 171 strikeouts in 1989 tied him for 10th most strikeouts in a season for a right-handed batter since 1893. On July 11, 1990, against the Orioles, Jackson performed his famous "wall run", when he caught a ball six strides away from the wall. As he caught the ball at full tilt, Jackson looked up and ran three steps along the wall, to avoid impact and the risk of injury from the fence.

Before Royals games, Jackson used to shoot at a target with a bow and arrow in the Royals clubhouse.

During the 1990 season, Jackson hit HRs in four consecutive at-bats tying a Major League record (held by several). His fourth came off of Randy Johnson after hitting his first three before a stint on the disabled list. Unwilling to pay his $2.375 million salary in 1991 to rehabilitate his football injury, the Royals released Jackson on March 18, 1991.

Chicago White Sox and California Angels
Only 16 days after Jackson was released by the Royals, the Chicago White Sox offered him a three-year deal, guaranteeing $700,000 per season with a performance-based upside of $8.15 million over the term. White Sox co-owner Jerry Reinsdorf stated they did not anticipate him to play all seasons while he addressed his hip issues and avascular necrosis. Jackson played two seasons appearing in 23 games in 1991 and 85 games in 1993. He appeared on White Sox' disabled roster during the 1992 season due to completing hip replacement surgery earlier that year. It was with the White Sox that he made his only post-season appearance, in the 1993 American League Championship Series, which Chicago lost to the Toronto Blue Jays in six games.

While with the White Sox, Jackson promised his mother that once he returned from his hip replacement surgery in 1993, he would hit a home run for her. Before he could return, his mother died. In his first at-bat after surgery, he hit a home run to right field. Jackson recovered the ball by trading an autographed bat for it, and stated he planned to have it bronzed and placed on her dresser.

Jackson finished his career in 1994 with the California Angels. That season was cut short by the 1994–95 baseball strike, and Jackson decided to retire at age 32. "I got to know my family," he said, "That looks better to me than any $10 million contract."

In his eight baseball seasons, Jackson had a career batting average of .250, hit 141 home runs and had 415 RBIs, with a slugging average of .474. His best year was 1989, with his effort earning him All-Star status. In 1989, Jackson ranked fourth in the American League in both home runs, with 32, and RBI, with 105.

Notable achievements
 AL All-Star (1989)
 1989 All-Star Game MVP
 1993 AL Comeback Player of the Year Award
 10th in the 1989 AL MVP race
 30-Home Run Seasons: 1 (1989)
 20-Home Run Seasons: 4 (1987–1990)
 20-Stolen Base Seasons: 2 (1988–1989)
 100 RBI Seasons: 1 (1989)

MLB statistics

Football
During his junior and senior years at Auburn, Jackson transitioned his focus to baseball and became increasingly vocal about his unwillingness to play in the NFL.

A month before the 1986 NFL Draft, Tampa Bay Buccaneers owner and Alabama alum Hugh Culverhouse took him on a private jet to visit with the team and get a physical during his senior baseball season. Jackson was told by the Buccaneers that the trip had been cleared by the NCAA and SEC. In truth, it had not, and because the SEC barred athletes from being professional in one sport and amateur in another, he was declared ineligible near the tail end of his senior baseball season. Years later, Jackson told ESPN that he has long believed the Buccaneers sabotaged his collegiate baseball career "because of the season I was having". He was so angry at the Buccaneers' actions that he vowed never to play a down for them, going as far as to tell Culverhouse, "You draft me if you want. You're going to waste a draft pick. I can promise you that."

Jackson's collegiate baseball coach, Hal Baird, told the Tampa Bay Times that no one from either camp mentioned the trip to him, and feared the worst when Jackson told him that the trip had been paid for. Baird maintained that had he known about the trip, he would have told Jackson about the SEC rule that barred him from playing professional football while being an amateur in baseball. Along similar lines, Dye told the Times that once Jackson concluded that the Tampa Bay trip was "a tactical move", it ended any chance of him ever playing for the Buccaneers.

Despite this, the Buccaneers selected Jackson with the first overall pick in the 1986 draft. Jackson turned down the Buccaneers' $7.6 million, five-year contract in favor of a $1.07 million, three-year contract with the Kansas City Royals, and the Buccaneers forfeited his rights before the 1987 draft. Choosing to sleep in rather than attend the 1987 NFL Draft, Jackson found out that he was selected in the seventh round of the draft with the 183rd pick by the Los Angeles Raiders. Initially, Jackson stated he would continue to focus on baseball and would not sign, but his interest was piqued when he learned Raiders owner Al Davis was a fan of Jackson and receptive to Jackson playing both baseball and football. A five-year, $7.4 million contract was negotiated where Jackson would be permitted to play the entire baseball season with the Royals and would report to the Raiders once the MLB season was finished even if it meant missing NFL games. In addition to this, Davis gave Jackson the highest salary of any non-quarterback player in NFL history, and Jackson would receive a reported $500,000 signing bonus plus another $500,000 if he returned the following year in 1988.

Jackson joined the Raiders in time for their Week 8 matchup against the New England Patriots, where he rushed for a total of 37 yards on eight carries. Jackson shared the backfield with Marcus Allen, himself an All-Pro and former Heisman Trophy winner, but eventually supplanted him as the featured running back despite being listed as the team's fullback. Perhaps his most notable performance in his rookie season came on Monday Night Football against the Seattle Seahawks in Week 12. Prior to the game Seahawks linebacker Brian Bosworth insulted Jackson and promised in a media event before the game to contain Jackson. Jackson responded by running over Bosworth on his way to a touchdown near the goal line. He also made a 91-yard run in the 2nd quarter, to the outside, untouched down the sideline. Jackson rushed for 221 yards that night and two touchdowns. He added a third with a reception. The 221 yards was a single-game record for the Raiders at the time.

In his rookie season, Jackson rushed for a total of 554 yards on only 81 carries for a 6.8 yards per carry average. He played in seven games, starting five, and scored a total of six touchdowns (four rushing, two receiving). The next year, Jackson played in ten of the Raiders' sixteen games with nine starts, recording a total of 580 yards and three touchdowns.

Jackson's 1989 season was his best in the league. In eleven games, with nine starts, Jackson rushed for a total of 950 yards with a 5.5 yards per carry average and four touchdowns. In his abbreviated 1990 campaign, Jackson rushed for 698 yards and was selected to the only Pro Bowl of his career.

Jackson sustained an NFL career-ending hip injury from a seemingly routine tackle at the end of a 34-yard run in a playoff game on January 13, 1991, against the Bengals.

In his four seasons in the NFL, Jackson rushed for 2,782 yards and 16 touchdowns with an average yards per carry of 5.4. He also caught 40 passes for 352 yards and two touchdowns. Jackson's 221 yards on November 30, 1987, just 29 days after his first NFL carry, is still a Monday Night Football record.

NFL statistics

Hip injury
Jackson's athletic career was affected by an injury to his left hip. In his last football game, the playoff victory over the Cincinnati Bengals in January 1991, Jackson suffered a dislocated hip following a tackle. In the film You Don't Know Bo, Jackson claimed that when he realized his injury on the field, he popped his hip back into the socket, which damaged the blood vessels supplying blood to the hip. While doctors did not find proof that Jackson reset his hip, they did discover that there was a fracture of one of Jackson's hip bones, as well as traumatic chondrolysis (loss of the thin layer of cartilage that lines the ball-and-socket hip joint) and avascular necrosis (death of bone tissue) of the femoral head. He would be forced to retire from football, and was then cut by the Royals in spring training. Jackson would return to competition with the White Sox toward the end of the 1991 baseball season but did not play the 1992 season while having his hip replaced.

Popularity

"Bo Knows"

Jackson became a popular figure for his athleticism in multiple sports through the late 1980s and early 1990s. He endorsed Nike and was involved in a popular ad campaign called "Bo Knows" which envisioned Jackson attempting to take up a litany of other sports, including tennis, golf, luge, auto racing, ice hockey, and playing blues music with Bo Diddley, who scolded Jackson by telling him, "You don't know Diddley!" This "Bo Knows" marketing campaign was for the release of the Nike Air Trainer I, a cross-training shoe, the first of its kind.

Homage
The CHIKARA professional wrestling tag team the Throwbacks (baseball player Dasher Hatfield and football player Mark "Mr. Touchdown" Angelosetti) had a finishing move called "Bo Jackson".

In 1992, the American hip-hop group A Tribe Called Quest referenced Jackson in their song "Scenario."

In 1997, Foxy Brown referenced Jackson in her song "Big Bad Mamma."
 
Radio personality James Golden adopted the stage name "Bo Snerdley" in homage to Jackson. ("Snerdley" was a last name that Golden's employer, Rush Limbaugh, frequently used as a placeholder name.)

Video games
Called "the greatest athlete in video game history", Jackson's digital counterpart was nicknamed by fans "Tecmo Bo" since being featured in the 1991 video game Tecmo Super Bowl for the Nintendo Entertainment System, where he is all but untacklable. Players would make the popular move of running Bo all the way back to his own 1 yard line, then run 99 yards for a touchdown with defenders literally bouncing off him. Referencing his video game character, Jackson was featured in a 2016 advertisement for the Kia Sorento, with Jackson driving the car into a virtual stadium (a second ad features Brian Bosworth with Jackson referencing the infamous Monday Night Football touchdown run).

He has his own video game for the original Game Boy portable gaming system, Bo Jackson's Hit and Run. The game featured both baseball and football. Released around the same time was Bo Jackson Baseball for the NES system and IBM-compatible computers. Jackson can be unlocked as a player in ESPN NFL Football. Jackson made an appearance in the 2004 video game NFL Street 2. Jackson also made his first appearance in the modern Madden series, Madden 15 and Madden 16. He later returned in Madden NFL 20 as part of the Madden Ultimate Team 10th Anniversary promo, before getting a community-made Golden Ticket card.

Television
Jackson was a character in ProStars, an NBC Saturday morning cartoon show which also featured Wayne Gretzky and Michael Jordan fighting crime and helping children, although neither he, nor Gretzky, nor Jordan voiced their respective characters. He did however play the character of Calvin Farquhar, a sports radio jockey, on the TV show Married...with Children.

He also appeared in an episode of the TV series Lois & Clark: The New Adventures of Superman in which he plays a basketball game with Clark Kent/Superman. He was also in the episode 'Naked Babies' (1995) on Diagnosis Murder, playing a nanny to four babies who had just had their mother kidnapped.

Life after sports

In 1995, Jackson completed his Bachelor of Science degree in Family and Child Development at Auburn to fulfill the promise he made to his mother.

Through the 1990s, Jackson dabbled in acting, having made several television guest appearances first on The Fresh Prince of Bel-Air in 1990 as well as Lois & Clark: The New Adventures of Superman, Moesha, and Married... with Children. He later appeared in small roles in the films The Chamber, The Pandora Project and Fakin' Da Funk.

Jackson served as the President of the HealthSouth Sports Medicine Council, part of Birmingham, Alabama-based HealthSouth Corporation.

In 2007, Nike released a set of Nike Dunk shoes honoring Bo Jackson. The set featured three colorways based on previously released Nike shoes: the "Bo Knows" Trainer I, Trainer 91 and Medicine Ball Trainer III.

Jackson was inducted into the Baseball Reliquary's Shrine of the Eternals in 2016.

Bo Jackson's number 34 jerseys are still sold by the Las Vegas Raiders.

Working with his brand Promise Nutraceuticals, Jackson announced a line of CBD products called Hero Brand CBD in November 2021.

Personal life
Jackson is married to Linda, a rehabilitation counselor, and has three children – sons Garrett and Nicholas, and a daughter, Morgan. Jackson and his family live in Burr Ridge, Illinois. In 2009, he joined the board of Burr Ridge Bank and Trust. In 2013, the bank was acquired by First Community Financial Bank, who retained Jackson as a board member. In 2017, First Community was acquired by Busey Bank, and Jackson left the board.

The Chicago White Sox chose Jackson to throw the ceremonial first pitch before Game Two of the 2005 World Series. The White Sox went on to win that game on a 9th-inning walk-off home run, then swept the Houston Astros for their first championship in 88 years.

In 2007, Jackson came together with John Cangelosi to form the Bo Jackson Elite Sports Complex, an  multi-sport dome facility in Lockport, Illinois. He is part-owner and CEO of the facility. He has been successful with other investments, including a food company, N'Genuity. He often says that while he may have been great for sports, sports were no doubt greater for him considering the post-career opportunities that have been afforded him.

On May 9, 2009, Jackson delivered the commencement speech at Auburn University's graduation ceremony. His speech was centered on the benefits of stepping out of one's comfort zone.

On July 12, 2010, Jackson threw the ceremonial first pitch before the 2010 Home Run Derby at Angel Stadium and participated in the celebrity softball game.

In December 2010, he was named a 2011 winner of the NCAA Silver Anniversary Award, given annually to six former NCAA student-athletes for distinguished career accomplishment on the 25th anniversary of their college graduation.

In April 2012, Jackson participated in Bo Bikes Bama, a five-day, 300-mile gran fondo in support of victims of the tornado outbreak in Alabama. The five-day gran fondo was a one-time event and has become an annual maximum single-day gran fondo lasting approximately 62 miles.

On January 22, 2014, Jackson rejoined the Chicago White Sox as an ambassador for the team – joining the ranks of Frank Thomas, Minnie Miñoso, Carlton Fisk, Ron Kittle, Carlos May, and Bill Melton.

In a 2017 interview with USA Today, Jackson said he never would have played football if he had known the health risks associated with it. "I wish I had known about all of those head injuries, but no one knew that. And the people that did know that, they wouldn't tell anybody," he said. "The game has gotten so violent, so rough. We're so much more educated on this CTE stuff (chronic traumatic encephalopathy), there's no way I would ever allow my kids to play football today."

Jackson is known to frequently refer to himself in the third person, a habit he has had since his childhood due to his severe stutter which made it difficult for him to say "I".

Charity
In an effort to help his native state of Alabama, Jackson began a fundraiser known as "Bo Bikes Bama". The event began after a series of tornadoes devastated Alabama on April 27, 2011. The tornadoes claimed hundreds of lives and left many Alabama residents without power. The bike tour lasted five days where Jackson visited towns that had been demolished by the series of tornadoes. Bo was accompanied on this tour by celebrities such as Scottie Pippen, Ken Griffey Jr., Lance Armstrong, and Brett Favre. Today, the "Bo Bikes Bama" campaign has raised over $1.1 million for the Alabama Governor's Emergency Relief Fund.

In 2022, he donated $170,000 to pay for the funeral expenses for the victims' families following the massacre of 19 children and two adults in Uvalde, Texas.

See also

List of multi-sport athletes
 List of athletes who played in Major League Baseball and the National Football League

Notes

References

Further reading
Gutman, Bill, Bo Jackson, 1991, Simon Spotlight Entertainment
White, Ellen Emerson, Bo Jackson: Playing the Games, 1990

External links

 
 
 
 
 
 Bo Jackson at SABR (Baseball BioProject)

 
1962 births
Living people
African-American baseball players
African-American players of American football
African-American male track and field athletes
All-American college football players
American bankers
American chief executives
American Conference Pro Bowl players
American football running backs
American League All-Stars
Auburn Tigers baseball players
Auburn Tigers football players
Auburn Tigers men's track and field athletes
Baseball players from Alabama
Birmingham Barons players
California Angels players
Chicago White Sox players
College Football Hall of Fame inductees
Heisman Trophy winners
Illeists
Kansas City Royals players
Los Angeles Raiders players
Major League Baseball All-Star Game MVPs
Major League Baseball left fielders
Memphis Chicks players
National Football League first-overall draft picks
People with speech impediment
People from Burr Ridge, Illinois
People from McCalla, Alabama
Players of American football from Alabama
Sarasota White Sox players
Sportspeople from Bessemer, Alabama
Track and field athletes from Alabama